Vyacheslav Vladimirovich Shiryayev (born 7 November 1973 in Kamyshin) is a former Russian football player.

Shiryayev played in the Russian Premier League with FC Tekstilshchik Kamyshin.

References

1973 births
People from Kamyshin
Living people
Soviet footballers
Russian footballers
FC Tekstilshchik Kamyshin players
Russian Premier League players
FC Torpedo NN Nizhny Novgorod players
Association football midfielders
Association football forwards
Sportspeople from Volgograd Oblast